Modrost starodavnega anka is a novel by Slovenian author Aksinja Kermauner. It was first published in 2000.

See also
List of Slovenian novels

Slovenian novels
2000 novels